Lightning Command (German: Die Blitzzentrale) is a 1921 German silent action film directed by and starring Valy Arnheim.

Cast
 Valy Arnheim as Harry Hill 
 Victor Colani
 Adalbert Lenz
 Marga Lindt
 John Rappeport
 Willy Zizold

References

Bibliography
 Grange, William. Cultural Chronicle of the Weimar Republic. Scarecrow Press, 2008.

External links

1921 films
Films of the Weimar Republic
German silent feature films
Films directed by Valy Arnheim
1920s action films
German action films
German black-and-white films
1920s German films
Silent action films